Shell Lake High School is a high school in Shell Lake, Wisconsin, in Washburn County, Wisconsin.

The school had a separate school called the Shell Lake Primary school that educated grades K–2. In 2018, a local referendum was successfully voted on and passed in the Shell Lake community. This resulted in an expansion on the high school to build classrooms for grades K - 2 and including both a second gymnasium and an auditorium. The Shell Lake Primary School's final year was the 2019/2020 academic year. The final year was cut short in March 2020 due to the COVID19 pandemic resulting in the remainder of the academic year to be finished through online education.

Sports
Shell Lake High School is Division 3 for most sports of the Wisconsin Interscholastic Athletic Association. Their team name is the Shell Lake Lakers. Shell Lake High School is noted for its football team, which has claimed three state titles. The school has also won a state title in team wrestling and girls' track athletics. Their baseball team has gone to state and earned the runner-up title.

Sports played at Shell Lake High School include: Football, Volleyball (girls only), Basketball, Track and Field, Baseball, Softball, Cross Country, and Wrestling.

Public high schools in Wisconsin
Schools in Washburn County, Wisconsin
Public middle schools in Wisconsin
Public elementary schools in Wisconsin